Equestrian at the 2014 Asian Games was held in Dream Park Equestrian Venue, Incheon, South Korea from 20 September to 30 September 2014.

There were three equestrian disciplines: dressage, eventing and jumping. All three disciplines were further divided into individual and team contests for a total of six events.

Schedule

Medalists

Medal table

Participating nations
A total of 100 athletes from 15 nations competed in equestrian at the 2014 Asian Games:

References

External links
Official website

 
2014
Equestrian
2014 in equestrian
2014 Asian Games